Ziv Caveda (born December 10, 1978) is an Ethiopian-born Israeli footballer. After not seeing much time at Hapoel Tel Aviv, Caveda transferred to Tzafririm Holon where he was an instant starter. His morale was dealt a lethal blow when he was taunted by Maccabi Netanya's Itzik Zohar in a league match.

Ziv younger cousin David is also a footballer, they played together in Tzafririm Holon.

Honours
Toto Cup (Leumit):
Winner (1): 2010

Footnotes

External links
Stats

1978 births
Living people
Ethiopian Jews
Ethiopian emigrants to Israel
Citizens of Israel through Law of Return
Israeli footballers
Association football midfielders
Hapoel Tzafririm Holon F.C. players
Hapoel Tel Aviv F.C. players
Beitar Jerusalem F.C. players
Hapoel Ramat Gan F.C. players
Hapoel Ashkelon F.C. players
Hapoel Haifa F.C. players
Hapoel Be'er Sheva F.C. players
Sektzia Ness Ziona F.C. players
Hapoel Nir Ramat HaSharon F.C. players
Maccabi Ahi Nazareth F.C. players
Maccabi Ironi Bat Yam F.C. players
Liga Leumit players
Israeli Premier League players
Jewish Israeli sportspeople
Israeli people of Ethiopian-Jewish descent
Sportspeople of Ethiopian descent